Östberg is a Swedish topographic surname, which means "east mountain" or "east hill", from the Swedish terms öst ("east") and berg ("mountain" or "hill"). Alternative spellings include Østberg and Ostberg. The surname may refer to:

Annika Östberg (born 1954), Swedish convict
Carolina Östberg (1853–1929), Swedish singer
Cecilia Östberg (born 1991), Swedish ice hockey player
Curt Östberg (1905–1969), Swedish tennis player
Frida Östberg (born 1977), Swedish footballer 
Gunnar Östberg (born 1923), Swedish cross-country skier
Ingvild Flugstad Østberg (born 1990), Norwegian cross-country skier
Ivar Østberg (born 1942), Norwegian politician
Mads Østberg (born 1987), Norwegian rally driver
Mattias Östberg (born 1977), Swedish footballer
Moje Östberg (1897–1984), Swedish Navy rear admiral
Olov Östberg, Swedish researcher
Ragnar Östberg (1866–1945), Swedish architect

References

Swedish-language surnames